Primulina is a genus of flowering plants in the African violet family Gesneriaceae. In 2011 the genus was expanded with the transfer of many species that had previously been placed in the genus Chirita. In 2016, five species were moved to the genus Deinostigma.

Species
Species include:

Primulina annamensis (Pellegr.) Mich.Möller & A.Weber
Primulina atroglandulosa (W.T.Wang) Mich.Möller & A.Weber
Primulina atropurpurea (W.T.Wang) Mich.Möller & A.Weber
Primulina baishouensis (Y.G.Wei, H.Q.Wen & S.H.Zhong) Yin Z.Wang
Primulina balansae (Drake) Mich.Möller & A.Weber
Primulina bicolor (W.T.Wang) Mich.Möller & A.Weber
Primulina bipinnatifida (W.T.Wang) Yin Z.Wang & J.M.Li
Primulina bogneriana (B.L.Burtt) Mich.Möller & A.Weber
Primulina brachystigma (W.T.Wang) Mich.Möller & A.Weber
Primulina brachytricha (W.T.Wang & D.Y.Chen) R.B.Mao & Yin Z.Wang
Primulina brassicoides (W.T.Wang) Mich.Möller & A.Weber
Primulina brunnea (W.T.Wang) Mich.Möller & A.Weber
Primulina carnosifolia (C.Y.Wu ex H.W.Li) Yin Z.Wang
Primulina colaniae (Pellegr.) Mich.Möller & A.Weber
Primulina confertiflora (W.T.Wang) Mich.Möller & A.Weber
Primulina cordata Mich.Möller & A.Weber
Primulina cordifolia (D.Fang & W.T.Wang) Yin Z.Wang
Primulina crassituba (W.T.Wang) Mich.Möller & A.Weber
Primulina cruciformis (Chun) Mich.Möller & A.Weber
Primulina demissa (Hance) Mich.Möller & A.Weber
Primulina depressa (Hook.f.) Mich.Möller & A.Weber
Primulina drakei (B.L.Burtt) Mich.Möller & A.Weber
Primulina dryas (Dunn) Mich.Möller & A.Weber
Primulina eburnea (Hance) Yin Z.Wang
Primulina elegans B. M. Wang, Y. H. Tong & N. H. Xia
Primulina fangii (W.T.Wang) Mich.Möller & A.Weber
Primulina fimbrisepala (Hand.-Mazz.) Yin Z.Wang
Primulina flavimaculata (W.T.Wang) Mich.Möller & A.Weber
Primulina floribunda (W.T.Wang) Mich.Möller & A.Weber
Primulina fordii (Hemsl.) Yin Z.Wang
Primulina gemella (D.Wood) Yin Z.Wang
Primulina glabrescens (W.T.Wang & D.Y.Chen) Mich.Möller & A.Weber
Primulina glandulosa (D.Fang, L.Zeng & D.H.Qin) Yin Z.Wang
Primulina grandibracteata (J.M.Li & Mich.Möller) Mich.Möller & A.Weber
Primulina gueilinensis (W.T.Wang) Yin Z.Wang & Yan Liu
Primulina guihaiensis (Y.G.Wei, B.Pan & W.X.Tang) Mich.Möller & A.Weber
Primulina halongensis (Kiew & T.H.Nguyên) Mich.Möller & A.Weber
Primulina hedyotidea (Chun) Yin Z.Wang
Primulina heterotricha (Merr.) Y.Dong & Yin Z.Wang
Primulina hiepii (Kiew) Mich.Möller & A.Weber
Primulina hochiensis (C.C.Huang & X.X.Chen) Mich.Möller & A.Weber
Primulina jiuwanshanica (W.T.Wang) Yin Z.Wang
Primulina juliae (Hance) Mich.Möller & A.Weber
Primulina langshanica (W.T.Wang) Yin Z.Wang
Primulina latinervis (W.T.Wang) Mich.Möller & A.Weber
Primulina laxiflora (W.T.Wang) Yin Z.Wang
Primulina leeii (F.Wen, Yue Wang & Q.X.Zhang) Mich.Möller & A.Weber
Primulina leiophylla (W.T.Wang) Yin Z.Wang
Primulina liboensis (W.T.Wang & D.Y.Chen) Mich.Möller & A.Weber
Primulina lienxienensis (W.T.Wang) Mich.Möller & A.Weber
Primulina liguliformis (W.T.Wang) Mich.Möller & A.Weber
Primulina linearifolia (W.T.Wang) Yin Z.Wang
Primulina lingchuanensis (Yan Liu & Y.G.Wei) Mich.Möller & A.Weber
Primulina linglingensis (W.T.Wang) Mich.Möller & A.Weber
Primulina liujiangensis (D.Fang & D.H.Qin) Yan Liu
Primulina lobulata (W.T.Wang) Mich.Möller & A.Weber
Primulina longgangensis (W.T.Wang) Yan Liu & Yin Z.Wang
Primulina longicalyx (J.M.Li & Yin Z.Wang) Mich.Möller & A.Weber
Primulina longii (Z.Yu Li) Z.Yu Li
Primulina lunglinensis (W.T.Wang) Mich.Möller & A.Weber
Primulina lungzhouensis (W.T.Wang) Mich.Möller & A.Weber
Primulina luochengensis (Yan Liu & W.B.Xu) Mich.Möller & A.Weber
Primulina lutea (Yan Liu & Y.G.Wei) Mich.Möller & A.Weber
Primulina luzhaiensis (Yan Liu, Y.S.Huang & W.B.Xu) Mich.Möller & A.Weber
Primulina macrodonta (D.Fang & D.H.Qin) Mich.Möller & A.Weber
Primulina macrorhiza (D.Fang & D.H.Qin) Mich.Möller & A.Weber
Primulina maguanensis (Z.Yu Li, H.Jiang & H.Xu) Mich.Möller & A.Weber
Primulina medica (D.Fang) Yin Z.Wang
Primulina minutimaculata (D.Fang & W.T.Wang) Yin Z.Wang
Primulina modesta (Kiew & T.H.Nguyên) Mich.Möller & A.Weber
Primulina mollifolia (D.Fang & W.T Wang) J.M.Li & Yin Z.Wang
Primulina nandanensis (S.X.Huang, Y.G.Wei & W.H.Luo) Mich.Möller & A.Weber
Primulina napoensis (Z.Yu Li) Mich.Möller & A.Weber
Primulina obtusidentata (W.T.Wang) Mich.Möller & A.Weber
Primulina ophiopogoides (D.Fang & W.T.Wang) Yin Z.Wang
Primulina orthandra (W.T.Wang) Mich.Möller & A.Weber
Primulina parvifolia (W.T.Wang) Yin Z.Wang & J.M.Li
Primulina pinnata (W.T.Wang) Yin Z.Wang
Primulina pinnatifida (Hand.-Mazz.) Yin Z.Wang
Primulina poilanei (Pellegr.) Mich.Möller & A.Weber
Primulina polycephala (Chun) Mich.Möller & A.Weber
Primulina pseudoeburnea (D.Fang & W.T.Wang) Mich.Möller & A.Weber
Primulina pseudoheterotricha (T.J.Zhou, B.Pan & W.B.Xu) Mich.Möller & A.Weber
Primulina pteropoda (W.T.Wang) Yan Liu
Primulina pungentisepala (W.T.Wang) Mich.Möller & A.Weber
Primulina renifolia (D.Fang & D.H.Qin) J.M.Li & Yin Z.Wang
Primulina repanda (W.T.Wang) Yin Z.Wang
Primulina ronganensis (D.Fang & Y.G.Wei) Mich.Möller & A.Weber
Primulina roseoalba (W.T.Wang) Mich.Möller & A.Weber
Primulina rotundifolia (Hemsl.) Mich.Möller & A.Weber
Primulina sclerophylla (W.T.Wang) Yan Liu
Primulina secundiflora (Chun) Mich.Möller & A.Weber
Primulina semicontorta (Pellegr.) Mich.Möller & A.Weber
Primulina shouchengensis (Z.Yu Li) Z.Yu Li
Primulina sichuanensis (W.T.Wang) Mich.Möller & A.Weber
Primulina skogiana (Z.Yu Li) Mich.Möller & A.Weber
Primulina spadiciformis (W.T.Wang) Mich.Möller & A.Weber
Primulina speluncae (Hand.-Mazz.) Mich.Möller & A.Weber
Primulina spinulosa (D.Fang & W.T.Wang) Yin Z.Wang
Primulina subrhomboidea (W.T.Wang) Yin Z.Wang
Primulina subulata (W.T.Wang) Mich.Möller & A.Weber
Primulina subulatisepala (W.T.Wang) Mich.Möller & A.Weber
Primulina swinglei (Merr.) Mich.Möller & A.Weber
Primulina tabacum Hance
Primulina tenuifolia (W.T.Wang) Yin Z.Wang
Primulina tenuituba (W.T.Wang) Yin Z.Wang
Primulina tribracteata (W.T.Wang) Mich.Möller & A.Weber
Primulina varicolor (D.Fang & D.H.Qin) Yin Z.Wang
Primulina verecunda (Chun) Mich.Möller & A.Weber
Primulina vestita (D.Wood) Mich.Möller & A.Weber
Primulina villosissima (W.T.Wang) Mich.Möller & A.Weber
Primulina wangiana (Z.Yu Li) Mich.Möller & A.Weber
Primulina weii Mich.Möller & A.Weber
Primulina wentsaii (D.Fang & L.Zeng) Yin Z.Wang
Primulina xinningensis (W.T.Wang) Mich.Möller & A.Weber
Primulina xiuningensis (X.L.Liu & X.H.Guo) Mich.Möller & A.Weber
Primulina yungfuensis (W.T.Wang) Mich.Möller & A.Weber

Formerly placed here
The following species were moved to the genus Deinostigma in 2016.
Deinostigma cycnostyla (B.L.Burtt) D.J.Middleton & H.J.Atkins as P. cycnostyla
Deinostigma cyrtocarpa (D.Fang & L.Zeng) Mich.Möller & H.J.Atkins  as P. cyrtocarpa
Deinostigma eberhardtii (Pellegr.) D.J.Middleton & H.J.Atkins  as P. eberhardtii
Deinostigma minutihamata (D.Wood) D.J.Middleton & H.J.Atkins  as P. minutihamata
Deinostigma tamiana (B.L.Burtt) D.J.Middleton & H.J.Atkins  as P. tamiana

References

 
Gesneriaceae genera